Rory and The Island has had 10 top 40 songs in the Irish iTunes rock charts, with "Jimmy's Winning Matches" breaking through to the actual overall Irish top 10 in October 2012.  Lead singer Rory Gallagher was the bass player and lead vocalist with Irish Indie/Pop/Punk group 'The Revs' from 2000 to 2007.

Background 

In his time with The Revs they released numerous hit radio singles and 3 Albums; Sonictonic in 2002 (no. 5 Irish Charts), Suck in 2003 (no. 3 Irish Charts) and The Revs in 2005 (no. 26 Irish Charts).  The Revs played the Oxegen (Irelands biggest annual music festival) Main Stage 4 times, Slane Castle, toured the United States, Australia (where they had a top 30 hit with "Death of a DJ") the UK and Europe and supported the Kaiser Chiefs, Foo fighters, Muse and many others. The band picked up two Meteors, Hot Press and BBC awards, a single of the month with Kerrang!, MTV2 coverage and an average of 300 gigs/public appearances per year... it all flew at a rapid pace. However, in late 2006 it all came to an end as the public interest in the band had died.

To present day 

In 2008, Rory released his official solo debut album "God Bless the big bang". It received a positive reaction with Hotpress magazine declaring it "a Triumphant return" giving it 4 out of 5 stars, it also received album of the week from Today FM, The Sunday World and BBC Ulster. Rory released 2 singles from the Album and did 2 short tours of Ireland. However he had since become resident musician in Charlies Bar Lanzarote and found it difficult to go and play in front of 50 people in small venues around Ireland losing all his money on Petrol and Hotels when there were already 150 Irish people coming into Charlies bar in Lanzarote every night of the week.

In 2010 Rory recorded some new original material with legendary Irish trad player Sharon Shannon (also a reworking of The Pogues classic "Fiesta" with Shane MacGowan), out of these sessions Rory had recorded a comedy demo song called "Ryanair Blues", it was leaked to Irish Radio and became a surprise online hit. It was then that Rory started releasing his new material under the name "RORY AND THE ISLAND" as it was a confusing using his birthname Rory Gallagher as many people would show up expecting a tribute to the Cork/ Donegal Blues Legend!

The second album, "Auntie Depressant and Uncle Hope" (2012) also received acclaim from Hot Press Magazine, summarising it as 'a compelling suite of songs'.  The album was recorded in various locations around the Spanish island of Lanzarote.

Rory wrote the music for Irish Boxer Jason Quigley's debut pro fight in Las Vegas, "Make Way for the Fighting Irish" in July 2014, Quigley now uses this as his Arena entrance theme song.

In Oct 2014 Rory played a sold out show to 550 people in the Opium rooms (The Village) in Dublin City, After this show Rory played "The Academy" venue in Dublin which holds 1000 people, supported by Eoin Glackin.

In 2015 Rory and The Island went on tour again, this time in Germany playing to sell out crowds.

The 3rd official studio album, "Watching the sun going down" , was released in July 2016.

Rory and the Island gigged 6 nights a week at The Island Bar in Puerto del Carmen, Lanzarote, which was voted the No.1 Live Music Bar on Trip Advisor for 5 years running. (2013 - 2018). 

In 2020 Rory and his wife Cara decided to open a new live music venue in Edinburgh, Scotland. However after paying a large sum for the lease and redecorating the bar never made it to its official opening night of March 20th 2020 due to the global pandemic.

Rory then began live Facebook broadcasting during the pandemic to a huge response, and charted 3 top 20 singles on iTunes during this period.

After sold out shows in the likes of Dublin ,London, and a guest slot on BBC from the Edinburgh fringe festival in late 2021, Rory signed with new Irish indie label "Voices of the Sea" to release a new album in 2022.

Discography

Singles 
 Waterfall (2008)
 Rain Dancer (2008)
 Ryanair Blues (2010)
 Colours (2011)
 Champagne Lifestyle on Coca Cola Wages (2011)
 The Battle to stay positive (2011)
 Jimmy Selling Watches / Overground Artist (2011)
 Boys in Green (2012)
 Jimmy's Winning Matches (2012) No.11 in the Irish Charts
 Ballad of Mad Dog Coll (2013)
 Week of Alcohol (2014)
 Sometimes you shouldn't follow your heart (2014)
 Belfast (2014)
 Peace and Love and Ringo Starr (2015) 
 So Little Time (2019)
 When The Lights Go Down (Valhalla) (2020)
 Miss This (2021)
 Donna Don't Take My Summer (2021),

Albums 

 God Bless the Big Bang (2008)- (rory)
 Auntie Depressant and Uncle Hope (2012)
 Dingo Rush EP (2013)
 Watching the sun going down (2016)
 Addicted to Applause (EP) (2019)

  Centre Falls Apart (2022)
PREVIOUS:
 20th Century (released under the name Rory Gallagher) – (1997)
 SonicTonic (THE REVS) – 2002
 Suck       (THE REVS) – 2003
 Revs       The Revs – 2005

References 

Musical groups from County Donegal